Veena Rawat  is an electrical engineer who specializes in telecommunications. Rawat was the first woman to graduate with a PhD in electrical engineering from Queen's University in Kingston, Ontario, Canada.  She held executive positions managing programs related to radio frequency spectrum engineering for all wireless and space communication services in the Canadian Government, was the President of the Communications Research Centre (CRC), and was the Vice President and Ambassador to the International Telecommunication Union, for Blackberry, Advanced Technology Division, Canada. In 2014 she was awarded the Officer of the Order of Canada (OC) for her lifetime achievements and contributions at the national and international levels to wireless communications.

Personal
Rawat emigrated to Canada from India in 1968. She speaks English, French, Hindi and Spanish.

Education
In 1967 she graduated from Birla Institute of Technology and Science, Pilani, India, with M. Tech in Electronics.

In 1973, Rawat was the first woman to graduate with a PhD in electrical engineering from Queen's University in Kingston, Ontario, Canada.

Career

Dr. Rawat came to CRC after spending 28 years within the Canadian Government where she held executive positions managing programs related to radio frequency spectrum engineering for all wireless and space communication services. This included: leading negotiations at the International Telecommunication Union of United Nations (ITU), Organization of American States (OAS) and US Government (FCC, NTIA); chairing major national and international committees; and consultations with senior executives of the telecom and space industry at global level to develop policies and regulations. Rawat was the first woman to chair a World Radiocommunication Conference (WRC-03), for which she was awarded an ITU gold medal. Also, Rawat was chair of the ITU-R SG-4 for Satellite Services and chair of numerous working groups and technical committees at ITU-R and WRCs.

During 2004-2011, Rawat was President of the Communications Research Centre, Canada's centre of excellence for telecommunications R&D, with 400 staff and an annual budget of over $50 million. For over 40 years, CRC has made significant contributions to the information and communications technology sector in Canada and abroad. The CRC’s research encompasses the four main platforms for information delivery: terrestrial wireless, satellite, fibre optics and broadcasting. Rawat was responsible for Canada’s participation in bilateral and multilateral information and communications technologies (ICT) research partnerships with many countries around the world.

In 2010 Rawat was a candidate for the position of Director, Radiocommunication Bureau, International Telecommunication Union (ITU).

Between 2011 and 2013, Rawat was Vice President and Ambassador to the International Telecommunication Union, for Blackberry, Advanced Technology Division, Canada. She was responsible for representing Blackberry at the ITU and various national and international fora at executive level in matters related to RF Spectrum planning, allocation, harmonization and coordination for wireless technologies and services.

Since Jan 2013, Rawat has been providing advisory services in the capacity of an internationally acclaimed wireless communications expert to various global telecommunications companies and organizations.

An internationally recognized expert in spectrum management and ICT technologies and trends, Rawat has been a keynote and invited speaker at over 100 domestic and international conferences and events since 1995.

Honours and awards
 Officer of the Order of Canada, 2014.
IEEE Communications Society Award for Public Service in the Field of Telecommunications, 2012 
 2011 Public Service Award of Excellence, Government of Canada.
 Canada’s Leading Woman High Tech Entrepreneur/Sara Kirke Award for Woman Entrepreneurship, Canadian Advanced Technology Alliance, 2008 
 Canada’s Most Powerful Women, Top 100, Canada’s Executive Women’s Network, 2005
 Leadership in Government Award, Wireless Communications Association International(USA), 2005
 Professional Woman of the Year Award, Indo-Canada Chamber of Commerce, 2005
 Canadian Woman of the Year in Communications, Canadian Women in Communications, 2004
 Radio Advisory Board of Canada Award of Excellence, Radio Advisory Board of Canada, 2004
 Honorary Fellowship, Broadcast Engineering Society, India, 2004.
 International Telecommunication Union (ITU) Gold Medal, World Radiocommunication Conference 2003 (WRC-03) Chairmanship, 2003
 Queen Elizabeth II Golden Jubilee Medal, 2003
 Excellence in Leadership Award, Industry Canada, 2003

References

External links
WRC–03 delivers a blueprint for the current and future needs of the global radiocommunication sector
Two of Canada's brightest win prestigious Sara Kirke Awards for women entrepreneurs in high-tech
University of Waterloo, Speaker Biographies
Canadian Women in Communications, Woman of the Year
Veena Rawat: Trailblazer, engineer and internationally acclaimed spectrum ambassador (includes an article from Wireless Telecom, Vol. 21, No. 4, Fourth Quarter, 20)
Clement supports UN bid, Embassy magazine, March 17, 2010
The women who make TV a hit, Ottawa Citizen, April 4, 2010
Clement supports UN bid, Embassy magazine, March 17, 2010
Heart & Stroke Foundation, The Heart Truth, Dr. Veena Rawat
Indian-born Canadian expert to contest International Telecommunication Union position, The Buzz, March 25, 2010
Dr. Rawat of Industry Canada to Run for Senior ITU Position, "Wireless Communications Association International, Industry and Associations Updates from the WCAI", June 21, 2010
Who is Dr. Rawat?, Reboot.FCC.Gov, The official blog of the Federal Communications Commission (U.S.A.)
Veena Rawat: Empowering Women, Reboot.FCC.Gov, The official blog of the Federal Communications Commission (U.S.A.)

Canadian women scientists
Living people
Queen's University at Kingston alumni
Canadian electrical engineers
Officers of the Order of Canada
Year of birth missing (living people)